UDP-4-amino-4-deoxy-L-arabinose formyltransferase (UDP-L-Ara4N formyltransferase, ArnAFT) is an enzyme with systematic name 10-formyltetrahydrofolate:UDP-4-amino-4-deoxy-beta-L-arabinose N-formyltransferase. This enzyme catalyses the following chemical reaction

 10-formyltetrahydrofolate + UDP-4-amino-4-deoxy-beta-L-arabinopyranose  5,6,7,8-tetrahydrofolate + UDP-4-deoxy-4-formamido-beta-L-arabinopyranose

The activity is part of a bifunctional enzyme that also performs the EC 1.1.1.305 reaction.

References

External links 
 

EC 2.1.2